The Khon Kaen International Marathon is held every late January in Khon Kaen, northeastern Thailand. It is organized by Khon Kaen University.

It is attended by dozens of runners from Ethiopia and Kenya, as well as by top runners from Thailand, Laos, Taiwan, and other countries. A total of 40,000 runners attended the marathon events in 2018. It has been organized for every consecutive year, and was founded in 2004.

Past winners 
Key:

Marathon 

(*) Not valid for records or rankings

Half marathon

11.55 km

References 

Khon Kaen International Marathon race results (12th-16th races)

External links 
Khon Kaen International Marathon official site

Marathons in Thailand